is an original anime television series produced and animated by NUT. The series aired from July to September 2020.

Synopsis

Setting
In the latter part of the 2400s, air pollution reached lethal levels. As humanity hurtled toward extinction, they were also threatened by the emergence of life forms known as Gadoll causing the destruction of 90% of the world's population. Large corporations developed cyborgs to carry out human functions, but the cyborgs eventually began to outnumber humans and the Solid Quake corporation acquired rights to manage humanity. The company created a giant dome on the Eurasian continent in which they installed a colossal entertainment facility called Deca-dence, with its own independent all-governing system to make all decisions. The cyborg citizens could then safely experience adventure as human avatars at Deca-dence without the risk of real injury.

Plot
In the fortress city of Deca-dence, the lowly Tanker girl, Natsume, dreams of becoming a Gear warrior following her father's death during a Gadoll attack. She is assigned to a maintenance team led by Kaburagi whom she discovers is more than he appears. Kaburagi has a secret role in eliminating "bugs", humans who threaten Solid Quake's operations. When Kaburagi discovers that Natsume is listed as dead in the company database, he decides to keep her under observation and offers to train her to fight.

Characters

A teenage Tanker girl who lost her father and her right arm due to a Gadoll attack when she was a child. She has a prosthetic right arm and dreams of joining the Power and fight the Gadoll as a warrior, but after graduating from the Tanker Orphanage, she ends up working under Kaburagi as a maintenance worker.

A veteran Deca-dence armor repairer with a blunt and surly manner. He was once a great warrior but lost the ardor to fight and spends his days supervising a team on maintenance duties. He follows the cyborg Hugin's orders and spends his nights eliminating "bugs" by removing their chips. His apathetic state of mind changes through his encounter with Natsume who is determined to become a fighter.

Natsume's best friend at the Tanker Orphanage.

One of Natsume's friends at the Tanker Orphanage.

A student at the Tanker Orphanage with long purple hair who teases Natsume about her ambitions to become a Gear.

A great female Tanker fighter who Natsume admires.

Commander of Deca-dence who has the responsibility of keeping the entertainment facility of Deca-dence operating effectively for the Solid Quake corporation.

A member of the Game Police who is always seen with Hugin.

He is second in command of Deca-dence, reporting to Hugin. He is also an old friend of Kaburagi and defies the rules by keeping avatars in stasis after their chips have been removed.

A "bug" which Kaburagi found six years ago and Natsume named Pipe because of its penchant to hold pieces of pipe in its mouth.

A self-appointed boss of the bugs in the Bug Correction Facility. He was previously one of Kaburagi's colleagues when he was a warrior.

A female bug with high level technical skills.

A bug Kaburagi meets at the Bug Correction Facility. While he is known to be cowardly and a pushover, he is capable of acquiring goods. He is known by the nickname "Sark".

A bug who is Donatello's henchman. He was previously one of Kaburagi's colleagues when he was a warrior. Thanks to his cruel personality, he likes to pick on the weak.

One of Kaburagi's colleagues when he was a warrior.

A place deep below Deca-dence where bugs are sent instead of being scrapped for insubordination. Their de facto leader is a Donatello, and other inmates include Jill, Turkey, and Sarkozy.

Beasts which often attack Deca-dence and have been given names such as: octhulhu, avispine, seldurum, spoonwormer, nemollis, burrn, darumoss, megaloain and the gigantic giland. Both the fortress city Deca-dence and the cyborg society under the control of the Solid Quake corporation utilize the liquid oxyone which flows through the Gadoll's veins as their power source.

Production
Deca-Dence was first announced on July 5, 2019 by Kadokawa, and is the first original anime work of NUT, known for producing the anime adaptation of The Saga of Tanya the Evil. It was directed by Yuzuru Tachikawa, written by Hiroshi Seko, featuring original character designs by Pomodorosa, animation character designs and chief animation direction by Shinichi Kurita, and music composed by Masahiro Tokuda. The Deca-dence fortress was designed by Zhou Haosong, the cyborgs were designed by Kiyotaka Oshiyama, and the Gadolls were designed by Satoshi Matsūra. The series was described as being a mash-up between Mortal Engines and Attack on Titan after the first episode was on air.

Director Yuzuru Tachikawa and chief producer Takuya Tsunoki, who had joined Madhouse around the same time and collaborated on the 2015 series Death Parade, had talked about creating their own original work. After the establishment of NUT in 2017, the idea of creating an original work was spurred within the company, and Tsunoki and chief producer Shō Tanaka, who collaborated on NUT's adaptation of The Saga of Tanya the Evil, had talked about "doing something" together. As a result, Tachikawa, Tsunoki, and Tanaka initiated the project. Writer Hiroshi Seko, who had previously worked with Tachikawa on Mob Psycho 100, was eventually added to the project after some foundations had been built and, together, the four created the series' original concepts.

Tachikawa prioritized developing the script for the dramatic beats that he wanted to depict because developing the setting and characters for an original work could take a long time. Having been written in its entirety based on the story concept created by Tachikawa, Tsunoki, Tanaka, and Seko, the script had to be revised from episode one to allow for more foreshadowing and narrative development in the first half of the story, such as brief introductions of the world view, so that the second half would not be so packed. As a result, more time was spent in the script meetings themselves. In this process, they discovered it was important to drill down on the relationship between Kaburagi and Natsume, and therefore put more effort to portray their interactions and how they complement the inefficiencies of each other from episode two to episode four.

While the production team decided to have a world view of "fighting against big monsters", they wanted to add a plot twist on top of it. Tachikawa then came up with the idea that "actually this world is a creation and operated by something else", which was accepted because it was both interesting and could easily allow for added depth when necessary.

The team decided to create new designs for the cyborgs instead of using skeletal or mechanical ones, and it was decided that said cyborgs would be hand drawn instead of being made with 3DCG. The design lightly referenced Doraemon, a robot from the future with a cute design. They also considered the cute, organic design as a mitigation to the violent atmosphere of the story. The designer of the cyborgs, Kiyotaka Oshiyama, had worked with NUT during the production of FLCL Alternative. The staff found Oshiyama's design of mechas to be organic and soft, yet still clearly mecha-like, which suited Deca-Dence, and therefore invited him to join the project.

The design of the cyborgs directly affected that of the Gadolls; while the team thought it was good to use ordinary designs, for example, dragon-like or spider-like monsters, Tachikawa was worried it would make the atmosphere of the story too violent. After Oshiyama's designs were finished, the team decided to make the Gadolls cuter but horrible because that is what those cyborgs would create. The designer of the Gadolls, Satoshi Matsūra, was invited by Tsunoki via the contact listed on Matsūra's Twitter account after Tsunoki occasionally found Matsūra's character designs on the Internet and thought the style was suitable.

Release
While the first episode had an advanced premiere screening at FunimationCon 2020 on July 3, 2020, the series officially aired from July 8 to September 23, 2020 on AT-X and other channels. The opening theme song, "Theater of Life", was performed by Konomi Suzuki, while the ending theme song, was performed by Kashitarō Itō.

Funimation licensed the anime for streaming worldwide except for Asia. On August 25, 2020, Funimation announced that the series would receive an English dub. Following Sony's acquisition of Crunchyroll, the series was moved to Crunchyroll. In Southeast Asia, Plus Media Networks Asia licensed the series, and broadcast it on Aniplus Asia. It's also available on Netflix in the region.

Episode list

Reception
Christopher Farris of Anime News Network gave the final episode a 3 out 5 stars score, concluding that the producers "didn't come down as definitively as they could with an alternative to that accursed capitalism, or manage to wrap everything with satisfyingly-tied emotional bows. But by god did they try".

Notes

References

External links
 
Official website 

Action anime and manga
Anime with original screenplays
AT-X (TV network) original programming
Crunchyroll anime
NUT (studio)
Science fiction anime and manga